The Volksraad of the South African Republic (English: "People's Council" of the South African Republic, Afrikaans: Volksraad van die Zuid-Afrikaansche Republiek) was the parliament of the former South African Republic (ZAR), it existed from 1840 to 1877, and from 1881 to 1902 in part of what is now South Africa. The body ceased to exist after the British Empire's victory in the Second Anglo-Boer War. The Volksraad sat in session in Ou Raadsaal in Church Square, Pretoria.

In 1840, at the beginning of the Natalia Republic, an adjunct Volksraad was created in Potchefstroom for settlers west of the Drakensberg. The Potchefstroom Volksraad continued despite the British annexation of the Natalia Republic in 1843. It eventually passed the Thirty-three Articles, the precursor to the 1858 constitution (Grondwet), in 1849. In 1858 the Grondwet permanently established the Volksraad as the supreme authority of the nation. 

Initially a unicameral body, the Volksraad was divided into two chambers in 1890 in order to keep Boer control over state matters while still giving Uitlanders (foreigners) — many of whom were temporarily employed in the mining industry — a say in local affairs, in order to fend off British complaints.

From 1890 the Volksraad consisted of two houses of 24 members each. The "Second Volksraad" had suffrage for all white males above 16 years, and had limited legislative powers in the fields of mining, road construction, copyright and certain commercial affairs, all subject to ratification by the "First Volksraad". This was the highest authority in charge of state policy, with preference being given to fully franchised burghers for appointment to government posts.

Volksraad was also the Afrikaans name for the House of Assembly, the principal or sole chamber of the Parliament of South Africa from 1910 to 1994.

References

South African Republic
Defunct unicameral legislatures
Defunct organisations based in South Africa
1857 establishments in South Africa
1902 disestablishments in South Africa